Shadmahan may refer to:

 Shadman, Qazvin, Qazvin Province
 Shad Mehan, Tehran Province